This page lists the World Best Year Performance in the year 1995 in the men's decathlon. One of the main events during this season were the 1995 World Championships in Gothenburg, Sweden.

Records

1995 World Year Ranking

See also
1995 Hypo-Meeting
1995 Décastar

References
decathlon2000
apulanta
digilander

1995
Decathlon Year Ranking, 1995